Latvenergo is a state-owned electric utility company in Latvia. Latvenergo Group provides energy supply services in the Baltics. 

The Group comprises the parent company Latvenergo AS, with decisive influence, and five subsidiaries. Latvenergo AS ensures generation and trade of electricity and thermal energy as well as trade of natural gas. Sadales tīkls AS ensures electricity distribution to each customer. Elektrum Eesti OÜ and Elektrum Lietuva UAB conduct electricity trade in Estonia and Lithuania respectively. Enerģijas publiskais tirgotājs AS carries out administration of electricity mandatory procurement.  

Latvenergo has four hydroelectric power plants: Pļaviņu HES, Rīgas HES, Ķeguma HES and Aiviekstes HES, with total installed capacity of 1535 MWt, two combined heat and power plants with total electrical capacity of 474 MWe and heat capacity of 1525 MWt and a wind farm near Ainaži with installed capacity of 1.2 MW.

References

External links
 Official site

Electric power companies of Latvia
Companies based in Riga
1958 establishments in Latvia